Wonderland Ranch Wash is an arroyo in the U.S. state of California. It is located in San Bernardino County.

References

Washes of California